The men's doubles SU5 tournament of the 2022 BWF Para-Badminton World Championships took place from 1 to 6 November.

Seeds 

 Dheva Anrimusthi / Hafizh Briliansyah Prawiranegara (Champion)
 Chirag Baretha / Raj Kumar (Semi-finals)

Group A

Group B

Finals

References 

Sports competitions in Tokyo
Badminton tournaments in Japan
2022 in Japanese sport
2022 in badminton
International sports competitions hosted by Japan
BWF Para-Badminton World Championships